Burundi elects a head of state – the president – and a legislature on the national level. The National Assembly (Assemblée nationale) has 118 members, elected for a five-year term by proportional representation with a 2% barrier. The Senate (Sénat) has 49 members, elected for a five-year term by electoral colleges of communal councilors. Extra seats in both chambers can be added to ensure that ethnic and gender quotas are met. Burundi has a multi-party system, with two or three strong parties and a third party that is electorally successful. Parties are usually based on ethnic background.

See also
 Electoral calendar
 Electoral system

References

External links
Adam Carr's Election Archive
African Elections Database